Tatocnemis is a genus of flatwings in the damselfly order Odonata. There are about 10 described species in Tatocnemis.

As a result of molecular phylogenetic studies by Bybee et al. in 2021, it is now in its own family, Tatocnemididae.

Species
 Tatocnemis crenulatipennis Fraser, 1952
 Tatocnemis denticularis Aguesse, 1968
 Tatocnemis emarginatipennis Fraser , 1960
 Tatocnemis malgassica Kirby, 1889
 Tatocnemis mellisi Schmidt, 1951
 Tatocnemis micromalgassica Aguesse, 1968
 Tatocnemis olsufieffi Schmidt, 1951
 Tatocnemis robinsoni Schmidt, 1951
 Tatocnemis sinuatipennis (Selys, 1891)
 Tatocnemis virginiae Legrand, 1992

References

Calopterygoidea
Zygoptera genera